GMM Tai Hub or GTH was a former film studio of the Thai entertainment conglomerate GMM Grammy. It was formed in 2003 by a merger between GMM Pictures, Tai Entertainment, and Hub Ho Hin Film following the box-office success of the childhood romantic comedy, Fan Chan, which the three companies had produced.

GTH was dissolved on 20 july 2021 due to internal conflicts. It was succeeded by GDH 559.

Background
In 2000, Tai Entertainment joined Hub Ho Hin Bangkok to produce The Iron Ladies, a film that became a domestic box office leader in 2001. In 2003, Tai Entertainment and Hub Ho Hin teamed up with GMM Pictures to produce My Girl.

Launched in May 2004, GTH was a fully independent joint venture from three of Thailand's most renowned and innovative media companies: GMM Grammy (held 51%), Tai Entertainment (held 30%), and Hub Ho Hin Bangkok (held 19%). They announced a merger partner and set up a new company under the name "GMM Tai Hub" or "GTH".

Partnerships
In 2014, GMM Tai Hub partnered with KBank to launch a new line of debit cards, "GTH is Me".

Dissolution
On 13 November 2015, GMM Tai Hub announced that GTH was to be dissolved on 20 july 2021. They cited internal disputes on the future direction of the firm as the reason for the breakup.

Filmography

This list includes some filmography produced by the predecessor companies GMM Pictures, Tai Entertainment, and Hub Ho Hin Bangkok Co. Ltd. Since 2016, all of these films' distribution rights have been owned by the successor company, GDH 559.

Television

TV series

Cable TV and TV channels
 GTH On Air
 GMM One
 GMM 25

See also
 GDH 559

External links

References

 
Film production companies of Thailand
Privately held companies
Mass media companies established in 2003
Mass media companies disestablished in 2015
2003 establishments in Thailand